The Middlesbrough RHC (Middlesbrough Roller Hockey Club) is a Roller Hockey team from Middlesbrough, England. It was founded in 1947.  In 2011, it won the 1st English title and its second in 2012 - 13, when the club won 11 consecutive matches after Christmas, scoring the winning goal in the last match of the season with 10 seconds left of the match. this was the only time in the season that the club had been top of the league.

The club trains Wednesdays (6-10pm) and Fridays (7-10pm) at the Middlesbrough Sports Village in Middlesbrough.

Trophies
1st - English premier league 2010-12 & 2012-13
1st - national cup winners 2012, 2010, 2009
2013 NCRHA Elite Cup Winners
2013 NCRHA U18s League Winners
2013 NCRHA U16s Cup Winners
2013 NCRHA U16s League

External links
Middlesbrough RHC Official Website

Roller hockey clubs in England